Faiz Hameed  (Punjabi & ) is a retired three-star Pakistani Army Lieutenant General and former spymaster who served as the 24th Director General of the ISI. He was commissioned in the Baloch Regiment having served as GOC 16th Infantry Division Pano Akil. He last served as Commander of the XXXI Corps.

Personal life & Family
Faiz was born in village of Latifal, Chakwal and he joined the Pakistan Military Academy in 1987, He graduated from Command & Staff College, Quetta and was commissioned in the Baloch Regiment of the Pakistan Army. He has three brothers, Sardar Sikandar Hayat, Sardar Najaf, and Sardar Khizar, His brother Sikandar Hayat died in 2016 in an accident and His brother Sardar Najaf Hameed is a land revenue officer in his hometown. Faiz Hameed’s family belongs to Chakwal which has produced prominent military commanders in the history of Pakistan.

Military Career
The Faiz was commissioned in the Pakistan Army’s Unit Baloch Regiment. He served as Adjutant General at the GHQ (General Headquarters) in Rawalpindi, Pakistan. (From April 2019 to June 2019). Lieutenant General Faiz Hameed previously served as head of the ISI (Counter Intelligence Wing). (From January 2017 to April 2019). He has remained GOC (General Officer Commanding) of 16 infantry divisions at Pano Akil Cantonment. (From June 2015 to January 2017). DG Inter-Services Intelligence (ISI) (From June 2019 6th October 2021) He also served as Corp Commander In Peshawar and Bahawalpur until his retirment.

Director-General of the ISI (2019–2021)
Lt Gen Faiz Hameed previously served as head of the ISI (Counter Intelligence Wing). Later he served as Director-General of Inter-Services Intelligence (DG-ISI) from June 2019 to 6th October 2021. He was the 24th Director-General of ISI. Lt Gen Faiz Hameed is best known for the role of chief spymaster. In September 2021, he visited Kabul just months after the Afghan Taliban took control of the country and discussed the changes after the US withdrawal.

Activities in Kabul After Taliban victory
During his time as head of the ISI amid the Fall of Kabul (2021) he reached Kabul a few days after the Afghan capital was conquered by the Taliban and He said to media that “What do you hope is going to happen now in Afghanistan,” a reporter asked General Faiz. Lt Gen Faiz Hameed told the reporter with a smile on his face, “Don’t worry, everything will be okay” in Afghanistan as he arrived in Kabul on what sources said was a day-long trip related to the security of the region.

Effective dates of promotion

Awards and decorations

Foreign decorations

References

External links
Pakistan's ISI chief Faiz Hameed visits Kabul for meeting with Taliban (Business Standard, Sept. 5, 2021)
 ISI Chief Gen Faiz Hameed meets Gulbuddin Hekmatyar, Taliban leaders in Kabul (Geo News, Sept. 5, 2021)
'Don't worry, everything will be okay': ISI chief during Kabul visit (Dawn News, Sept. 4, 2021)

Year of birth missing (living people)
Living people
Directors General of Inter-Services Intelligence
Pakistani Muslims
Pakistani Sunni Muslims
20th-century Muslims
21st-century Muslims
Punjabi people
People from Chakwal District
Pakistani generals
Pakistani Islamists
Recipients of Hilal-i-Imtiaz
Lieutenant generals